Enzo Turco (1902 – 7 July 1983) was an Italian film actor. He appeared in 39 films between 1939 and 1972. He was born in Naples, Italy and died in Rome, Italy.

Selected filmography
 Departure at Seven (1946)
 Fear and Sand (1948)
 Baron Carlo Mazza (1948)
 The Steamship Owner (1951)
 Toto Seeks Peace (1954)
 Poverty and Nobility (1954)
 Milanese in Naples (1954)
 The Thieves (1959)

References

External links

1902 births
1983 deaths
Italian male film actors
Italian male stage actors
20th-century Italian male actors